Edward Potts may refer to:

 Edward Potts (gymnast) (1881–1944), British Olympic gymnast
 Edward Potts (architect) (1839–1909), English architect
 Edward Potts Cheyney (1861–1947), American historian, and historical and economic writer